Events in chess in 1900:

News

 The American team wins the Anglo-American cable match for the second consecutive year with the score 6–4. The top board game between Harry Pillsbury (USA) and Joseph Henry Blackburne (UK) is a draw as is the second board between Jackson Showalter (USA) and Francis Joseph Lee (UK). US Champion Frank Marshall loses a drawn game due to a time-keeping error. The US fails to start Marshall's clock when he cables a draw offer on his move, and Marshall loses on time. (The proper procedure is to transmit a move along with the draw offer to start the opponent's clock.)
 World Champion Emanuel Lasker wins the Paris tournament, ahead of Harry Pillsbury, Géza Maróczy and Frank Marshall. The tournament is held as part of the Exposition Universelle.
 Richard Teichmann wins the London tournament.
 Carl Schlechter wins the tournament at Vienna.
 First place at the German Chess Congress in Munich is shared by Maróczy, Pillsbury, and Schlechter.
 S. Lipschutz wins at New York.
 Mikhail Chigorin wins the 1900/01 Moscow tournament.
 The inaugural U.S. Open Championship is won by Louis Uedemann.
 Henry Ernest Atkins wins the British Championship.

Births

 Josef Cukierman: (1900–1941) was a Polish-born French chess master.
 Marcel Engelmann Belgian master.
 Karl Poschauko was an Austrian chess master.
 Emmanuel Sapira (died 1943), Romanian-born Belgian chess master.
 January 29 – Irving Chernev (1900–1981), American chess player and author is born in Pryluky, Russian Empire.
 March 18 – Roberto Grau (1900–1944) Argentine master born in Buenos Aires.
 March 23 – José Joaquín Araiza (1900–1971), Mexican chess master.
 May 13 – Theodore Tylor (1900–1968), British chess player born in Bournville, England.
 August 13 – Nils Bergkvist Swedish master.
 October 24 – Robert Crépeaux (1900–1994), French master born in Grasse, 
 November 24 – Kurt Richter (1900–1969), German International Master and chess writer born in Berlin.
 December 11 – Wolfgang Hasenfuss (1900–1944) Latvian master born in Jēkabpils, Russian Empire.

Deaths

 February 12 – Ellen Gilbert, American correspondence player, dies in Hartford, Connecticut at age 62.
 April 18 – Rudolf Charousek, Hungarian master, dies in Budapest at age 26.
 August 12 – Wilhelm Steinitz, World Champion 1886–94, dies in poverty in New York City at age 64.
 November 10 – Luigi Centurini, Italian chess player and composer, dies in Genoa at age 80.

References

 
Chess by year